Domingo Damian Pilarte (born February 23, 1941 in the Dominican Republic) was a Christian evangelist who held mass crusades during the 1960s–1980s. He traveled to more than 80 countries preaching the Gospel of Jesus Christ. Many of the claimed miracles that occurred during his crusades have been documented in books, magazines and newspapers. These miracles included healings of the crippled, blind, deaf, mute, and terminally ill.

Early life
Domingo Pilarte was born in the Dominican Republic on February 23, 1941. He began preaching shortly after a near death experience where he lost his brother during a boating trip. He explains how God spoke to him and rescued him that day after nearly drowning, he documented this experience in his book titled My Calling.

Ministry
Pilarte, at the age of 17, began preaching a simple message of salvation through Jesus Christ. It wasn't long before his ministry grew and he began preaching in stadiums around the world. He traveled to many countries including Venezuela, Panama, Costa Rica, Colombia, Africa, Japan, Trinidad & Tobago, and the US. There were many claims of miracles witnessed during his crusades.

Family
Domingo Pilarte Sr. died on November 15, 2009. He is succeeded by his 5 children, Jimmy Pilarte, Josie Pilarte, Debbie Pilarte, and Ruth Pilarte. His ministry is succeeded by his son Domingo Pilarte Jr. He also has a grandson named Domingo Pilarte who is a professional MMA fighter (DomingoPilartemma.com).

Crusade gallery

General references

*

References

Books

Newspaper articles 

1941 births
2009 deaths
Evangelists
Dominican Republic Christians
Faith healers